Hans Wolfgang Liepmann (July 3, 1914 – June 24, 2009) was an American fluid dynamicist, aerospace scientist and emeritus Theodore von Kármán Professor of Aeronautics at the California Institute of Technology.

He is known for his numerous contributions in fluid mechanics covering a wide range of problem areas, such as flow instability and turbulence, gas kinetics, viscous compressible fluids and liquid helium flows.

Academic history 
Hans Liepmann received a Dr.Ing.h.c. from the University of Aachen and a Ph.D. from the University of Zurich in 1938.

In 1939 Liepmann joined Theodore von Kármán at Caltech as a Research Fellow in Aeronautics. He became Assistant Professor of Aeronautics in 1945, Associate Professor in 1946 and Professor from 1949 to 1974. From 1974 to 1976 he was Professor of Aeronautics and Applied Physics, from 1976 to 1983 Charles Lee Powell Professor of Fluid Mechanics and Thermodynamics and 1984-85 von Kármán Professor of Aeronautics. From 1972 to 1985 Liepmann was Director of the Guggenheim Aeronautical Laboratory and Executive Officer for Aeronautics from 1976 to 1985.

He retired in 1985, but remained the emeritus von Kármán Professor at Caltech.

Liepmann received several awards, a selection:
 1968: Ludwig-Prandtl-Ring from Deutsche Gesellschaft für Luft- und Raumfahrt
 1980: Fluid Dynamics Prize by the American Physical Society
 1985: Otto Laporte Award by the American Physical Society
 1986: National Medal of Science
 1986: Daniel Guggenheim Medal
 1993: National Medal of Technology for "Outstanding research contributions to the field of fluid mechanics"

Books 
 1957: (with Anatol Roshko) Elements of Gas Dynamics, John Wiley & Sons, Dover Publications (2002)
 1947: (with Allen E. Puckett) Introduction to Aerodynamics of a Compressible Fluid, John Wiley & Sons

References

External links 
 Hans W. Liepmann at the American Institute of Physics
 
 Passings: Hans W.Liepmann, longtime Caltech professor from Los Angeles Times

1914 births
2009 deaths
20th-century American engineers
California Institute of Technology faculty
National Medal of Technology recipients
National Medal of Science laureates
Fluid dynamicists
Members of the United States National Academy of Sciences
Fellows of the American Physical Society
Ludwig-Prandtl-Ring recipients